The Safe Haven Museum and Education Center is a museum in Oswego, New York that tells the story of 982 mainly Jewish refugees who fled Europe in the U.S. Government "Safe Haven" program.  They came to the Fort Ontario Emergency Refugee Shelter in Oswego, New York, in August 1944.

Safe Haven was the only official U.S. Government activity to rescue Jewish refugees during the Second World War, for victims of the Nazi Holocaust.  The refugees were brought from Italy, but deliberately only from other parts of Europe. They were all fleeing from the Nazis. They were deliberately chosen so that some incoming refugees were non-Jewish, so as to allay anti-semitic fears.

They were placed in Fort Ontario, behind barbed wire, and given no official status, and were told they would be returned to their homelands after the war, and would have no rights as regards entering the United States. In fact, due to political pressure, at the war's end they were allowed to stay in the United States.

Parenthetically, the group included a whole group of Boy Scouts.

See also
Oswego, New York
Fort Ontario Emergency Refugee Shelter

References

External links
Safe Haven Museum webpage
Safe Haven museum video
Story About The Program

History museums in New York (state)
Jewish museums in New York (state)
Museums in Oswego County, New York
Oswego, New York
World War II museums in the United States
The Holocaust and the United States